Calhoun County Airport  is a county-owned public-use airport located three miles (5 km) northwest of the central business district of Port Lavaca, a city in Calhoun County, Texas, United States.

Although most U.S. airports use the same three-letter location identifier for the FAA and IATA, Calhoun County Airport is assigned PKV by the FAA but has no designation from the IATA.

Facilities and aircraft 
The airport has two concrete helipads, twenty-four-hour self-service fuel tanks with AvGas and JetA.

The only fixed-base operator at the airport is Calhoun Air Center which is a full service FBO.  Flight instruction is available on the field from Calhoun Air Center.

For the 12-month period ending May 9, 2005, the airport had 6,600 aircraft operations, an average of 18 per day: 77% general aviation and 23% military. At that time there were 18 aircraft based at this airport: 83% single-engine, 11% multi-engine and 6% helicopter.

References

External links 

Airports in Texas
Transportation in Calhoun County, Texas
Buildings and structures in Calhoun County, Texas